Players may refer to:

Art, entertainment, and media
 Players (1979 film), a film starring Ali MacGraw
 Players (2012 film), a Bollywood film
 Players (Dicks novel), a novel by Terrance Dicks, based on the television series Doctor Who
 Players (DeLillo novel), a 1977 novel by Don DeLillo
 Players (1997 TV series), a 1997–1998 American crime drama that aired on NBC
 Players (2002 TV program), a 2002–2004 American video game-related television program that aired on G4
 Players (2010 TV series), a 2010 American sitcom that aired on Spike
 Players (2022 TV series), an American mockumentary series that premiered on Paramount+
 "Players" (Angel), an episode of Angel
 "Players" (Law & Order: Criminal Intent), an episode of Law & Order: Criminal Intent
 Players (album), an album by Too $hort
 The Club (play), a play by David Williamson, produced in the U.S. as Players
 Players (magazine), an American monthly men's magazine
 "Players" (song), a 2022 song by Coi Leray

Brands, enterprises, and organizations 
 John Player & Sons or simply Player's, a tobacco company
 Players Ball, an annual gathering of pimps in Chicago, Illinois
 Players International, a casino and gaming service
 Players' League, a 19th-century American baseball league
 Players Software, a brand label used by video-game developer Interceptor Micros
 Players' Theatre, a theatre in London
 The Players (Detroit, Michigan), an American club for actors
 The Players (New York City), or Players Club, an American private social club located in Gramercy Park, Manhattan
 The Players Championship, a wealthy golf tournament since 1974, now near Jacksonville, FL

See also 
 Pagliacci (English: Players), an opera by Leoncavallo
 Play (disambiguation)
 Player (disambiguation)
 Players Championship (disambiguation)
 The Players (disambiguation)